Jodhpur railway station (station code:- JU) is a major railway station located in Jodhpur, Rajasthan, India. The railway station is under the administrative control of North Western Railway of Indian Railways. Railway minister Ashwini Vaishnav who also hails from Jodhpur, proposed the rejuvenation plan of Jodhpur railway station in 500 crore and directed the officials to complete it within 3 years

History

Jodhpur railway station was opened in 1885 under the jurisdiction of New Jodhpur Railway The first train ran from Jodhpur to Luni on 9 March 1885. The New Jodhpur Railway was later combined with Bikaner Railway to form Jodhpur–Bikaner Railway in 1889 A Railway line was completed between Jodhpur and Bikaner in 1891, Later in 1900, lt combined with Jodhpur–Hyderabad Railway (some part of this railway is in Pakistan) leading to connection with Hyderabad of Sindh Province Later in 1924 Jodhpur and Bikaner Railways worked as independent Railways. After Independence, a part of Jodhpur Railway went to West Pakistan.(And Mein Point is Jodhpur Railway Station And Workshop 1917 to 1956 Under The ShivNath Ji Bhakrecha And First Men In India And Built 5 Number Osi Coach More Coaches And ShivNath Ji Is Very Powerful Man.)

Overview
Jodhpur Railway Station has 5 platforms and a total of 6 tracks. To decongest the main Jodhpur station (JU), the suburban station Bhagat Ki Kothi railway station (BGKT) was developed as the second main station for passenger trains.

Railway reorganization
Jodhpur–Bikaner line was merged with the Western Railway on 5 November 1951. Later North Western Railway came into existence on 1 October 2002. Jodhpur is amongst the top hundred booking stations of Indian Railway.

Suburban stations

References

External links
 
 

Transport in Jodhpur
Railway stations in Jodhpur district
Buildings and structures in Jodhpur
Jodhpur railway division